Batocera horsfieldi is a species of beetle in the family Cerambycidae. It was described by Hope in 1839. It is known from Bhutan, China,  India and Myanmar. The species is sometimes parasitically infected by Avetianella ambigua.

References

Batocerini
Beetles described in 1839
Beetles of Asia